Equitisation is a Vietnamese English term that denotes the conversion of a state-owned enterprise in Vietnam into a public (joint stock) company or a corporation by dividing ownership into shares. Equitisation is undertaken to further integrate the Vietnamese economy into the global market and gain access to foreign capital, and therefore often coincides with partial privatization, with the state retaining major or controlling stakes in the equitized firms.

See also 
 Corporatization
 Privatization
 Nationalization
 Socialist-oriented market economy

References
 PhD thesis: Equitisation and Stock-Market Development : The Case of Vietnam of Truong Dong Loc, July 2006, pdf 1.7mb.
 Overview of the Capital Markets in Vietnam and Directions for Development (World Bank Report May 2006) 1mb pdf, 82 pages

Economy of Vietnam